2018 Arkansas Question 5 was a ballot measure in Arkansas held on November 6, 2018, to gradually raise the minimum wage in Arkansas to $11.00 an hour by 2021.

Contents 

The exact text of the ballot measure read:

Results

References

Minimum wage law
United States labor law by state
2018 ballot measures
Arkansas ballot measures
2018 Arkansas elections
2018 in labor relations
2018 in American law